Microblepsis is a genus of moths belonging to the subfamily Drepaninae.

Species
Microblepsis acuminata (Leech, 1890)
Microblepsis cupreogrisea (Hampson, 1895)
Microblepsis flavilinea (Leech, 1890)
Microblepsis leucosticta (Hampson, 1895)
Microblepsis manleyi (Leech, 1898)
Microblepsis prunicolor (Moore, 1888)
Microblepsis rectilinea (Watson, 1968)
Microblepsis robusta (Oberthür, 1916)
Microblepsis rugosa (Watson, 1968)
Microblepsis violacea (Butler, 1889)

References

Drepaninae
Drepanidae genera